Pickway Corner is a neighborhood in southeastern Lexington, Kentucky, United States. Its boundaries are Nicholasville Road to the west, Man o' War Boulevard to the north, Waveland Museum Lane to the south, and farmland to the east.

Neighborhood statistics

 Area: 
 Population: 940
 Population density: 4,332 people per square mile
 Median household income (2010): $87,536

References

Neighborhoods in Lexington, Kentucky